"Here Comes My Girl" is a song written by Tom Petty and Mike Campbell, and recorded by Tom Petty and the Heartbreakers, their third single from their breakthrough hit 1979 album, Damn the Torpedoes. It peaked at number 59 on the U.S. Billboard Hot 100 on May 24, 1980.

Content
In a November 2003 interview with Songfacts, guitarist Mike Campbell explained the story behind "Here Comes My Girl":

Petty remembers Campbell's chords and tune on a cassette tape, and struggling with the lyrics. Bassist Ron Blair told Petty that what he had was a "really good piece of music." Petty learned to use narration in the verses, similar to Blondie or The Shangri-Las. Petty said the chorus was inspired by The Byrds.

Reception
Cash Box called it a "truly excellent single" with a "convincingly honest narrative intro" and a "Byrds-like hook." Record World called it a "raging ballad" and said that Petty's "tough talk/sing vocal swells into a pretty hook."

Music video
The music video was directed by John Goodhue and was released in April 1980.

Personnel
Tom Petty – lead vocals, rhythm guitar
Mike Campbell – lead guitar
Ron Blair – bass guitar
Stan Lynch – drums, backing vocals
Benmont Tench – piano, organ

Charts

Cover versions
In 2009, Matthew Sweet and Susanna Hoffs covered the song for their cover album, Under the Covers, Vol. 2.
In 2011, Relient K covered the song for their cover album, Is for Karaoke.

References

Tom Petty songs
1979 songs
Songs written by Tom Petty
Songs written by Mike Campbell (musician)